Bergen International Jazz Festival or  Nattjazz, is one of the largest jazz festivals of Norway. The festival has a musical profile with an emphasis on ethnic and contemporary jazz. It is held annually in late May, coinciding with Festspillene i Bergen, and is located at Verftet in Bergen.

Biography 

The festival was arranged for the first time in 1972 at Håndverkeren in Bergen (now closed). It moved to Studentsenteret in 1978 (now demolished and rebuilt), and eventually to USF Verftet in 1994. In 2012 Nattjazz was held in different localities in Vågsbunnen because of the reconstructions of USF Verftet.

During the course of the festival most concerts are held indoors, but with some outdoor concerts too. The festival has also collaborated with other events, such as Festspillene i Bergen in Grieghallen. Inside the USF Verftet there have been concerts on four different stages and the public bought admission to the house, not to individual concerts. The four scenes that were in use varied in capacity from about 70 to 700 people. Some rooms were set up with seating, others primarily with people standing. In addition, it was adapted to include areas where the public could relax and watch what happened at the various stages using internal channels. There were normally several artists on every stage in the course of an evening. This scheme was followed in 2012, although the stages were in different localities. Future plans are to re-establish the USF Verftet as the main location for events at the festival.

Since 2013 Røkeriet at USF Verftet has been the main venue for the Nattjazz events.

Nattjazzprisen or Hansaprisen 
Nattjazzprisen or Hansaprisen – verdt å vente på (Hansa Prize) was established in 2005 by the jazz festival Nattjazz in Bergen, Norway in collaboration with Hansa Borg Bryggerier. The prize worth NKR 50,000 is awarded annually under the Nattjazz i Bergen and is given to an artist the jury believes has international qualities and the potential for international success.

The following musicians have been awarded the Hansaprisen:
2005: Tord Gustavsen (piano), from Hurdal
2006: Kjetil Møster (saxophone), from Os
2007: Helge Lien (piano), from Moelv

Vital/Nattjazz talent award
2004: Marius Neset
2007: Øyvind Hegg-Lunde (drums), from Moelv
2009: Mari Kvien Brunvoll (vocals), from Molde

See also 
List of jazz festivals

References

External links 
 
Bergen Jazzforum

Jazz festivals in Norway
Music in Bergen
1972 establishments in Norway
Music festivals established in 1972
Festivals in Bergen
Culture in Hordaland
Annual events in Norway